Senator Serrano may refer to:

José M. Serrano (born 1972), New York State Senate
Sixto Hernández Serrano, Senate of Puerto Rico